The ASW 20 is an FAI 15 metre Class glider designed by Gerhard Waibel and built by Alexander Schleicher GmbH & Co. Its fuselage is nearly identical to that of the ASW 19, mated to newly designed flapped wings for the 15 metre Class.  The prototype first flew in 1977. It proved to be a highly successful glider, winning several World Championships, and was still being flown at this level up to 1995. Developments along its production life included winglets, pneumatic turbulators, and wingtip extensions. It remained in production until 1990, when it was superseded by the ASW 27. 765 were built by Schleicher and a further 140 were made under license by Centrair in France.

The ASW 20 was successful in competition, winning numerous world and national championships. Dick Johnson reported that the ASW 20 was the first 15 m glider to demonstrate a measured L/D in excess of 40:1. ASW 20s won second and third places in the 15 metre Class at the 1983 World Championships at Hobbs, New Mexico.

Construction
The ASW 20 is constructed from glass-reinforced plastic. It features trailing edge flaps which interconnect with the ailerons and allow the entire trailing edge to operate as a flap between -9 and +5 degrees. The flaps also act as ailerons, but deflect only half of the aileron amount. Schempp-Hirth type airbrakes are provided on the upper wing surface.

The B model (introduced in 1983) differs from the A and C model in that it uses a reinforced wing spar, which provides an increased water ballast capacity at the expense of the flexible wing. The B and C model include several enhancements over the original A model, including a lifting panel, hydraulic disc brake, and automatic elevator hookup. The B and C wings also incorporate a pneumatic turbulator system, which draws high pressure air from pitot inlets on the wing and injects it through approximately 860 pinholes into the boundary layer to control underwing airflow separation.

ASW 20s that include a L designation may be fitted with a 1.59 m wingtip extension. The F designation was assigned to A variants produced in France by Centrair. Centrair also produced an FL variant equivalent to the German ASW20L; most of these are only permitted to fly without the wingtip extensions due to a deficiency in the wing spar construction.

At least three different winglet designs have been produced for the ASW 20, including a NASA winglet fitted to the Centrair gliders (FP), a design by Peter Masak, and a second generation winglet designed by Prof. Mark D. Maughmer of Penn State University (USA).

Flight characteristics

The ASW-20 is known as a very pleasant handling glider in most respects. The wing structure composite layup was designed to twist slightly as the wings flexed upward, resulting in the ability to "store" some of the energy from atmospheric gusts, and then release that energy with a very slight forward thrust force as the wings flexed back downward to their normal position. This concept is known as the Katzmayr Effect, and somewhat mimics a bird's ability to use a flapping motion to propel itself forward in flight. This unique wing twisting movement gave the ASW-20 an ability to make very small but consistent performance gains (or reduced losses) in turbulent and gusty thermal conditions compared to other competition level sailplanes.

The landing flaps (55° in early models, 38° in later models), in conjunction with very effective airbrakes, allow the pilot to make exceptionally steep approaches at slow speeds, permitting very short landings when required. Second generation winglets further improved the handling and reduced drag at low to mid speeds. Thermal performance is comparable to gliders of more modern eras. These characteristics have made the ASW-20 a much beloved and desirable aircraft, even after it was no longer competitive in racing. One very common modification was the insertion of an intermediate flap setting detent (between zero and +1 position) which mitigated or softened any "tip-stall" and associated risk of spinning while thermaling in tight, gusty thermals. The flexible wing of the A and C models is particularly favored for ridge running, where it absorbs some of the tremendous turbulence found at ridgetop.

Variants

ASW20 Prototype and initial production
ASW20Lthe ASW20 with detachable outer wing extensions to  span, to compete in the Open-class.
ASW20B
ASW20BLthe ASW20B with detachable outer wing extensions to  span, to compete in the Open-class.
ASW20C
ASW20CLthe ASW20C with detachable outer wing extensions to  span, to compete in the Open-class.
ASW20CLT Open-class glider with PSR T01 turbojet sustainer
ASW20F ASW20A produced in France by Centrair
ASW20FP The ASW20F with NASA winglets designed to improve performance in weak conditions.

Specifications (ASW 20B)

See also

References

Further reading

External links

Alexander Schleicher GmbH & Co 
Johnson R, A Flight Test Evaluation of the ASW 20, Soaring, May 1978
Sailplane Directory ASW20
ASW 20 B Flight Manual
History and developmen of the ASW20, Dan Rihn, 9/4/2010

1970s German sailplanes
Schleicher aircraft
Motor gliders
T-tail aircraft
High-wing aircraft
Aircraft first flown in 1977